Vlastimil is a common Slavic origin given name originating from the roots: vlast (homeland) and mil (favour). A variant of the name is Vlastislav. The Czech name days are 17 March (Vlastimil) and 28 April (Vlastislav). The Slovak name day is 13 March (Vlastimil).

The feminine form is Vlastimila.

Short forms 
Vlasta, Vlastík, Vlastek, Mila

Notable bearers 
 Vlastislav - prince of Lucko (luts-kaw)
 Vlastimil Brodský - Czech actor
 Vlastislav Hofman - Czech architect, painter and graphic
 Vlastimil Hort, Czechoslovakian/German chess player
 Vlastimil Horváth - Czech rock singer
 Vlastimil Kopecký - Czech footballer
 Vlastimil Třešňák - Czech folk singer
 Vlastimil Tusar - Czech journalist and politician
 Vlasta Vrána - Czech-Canadian actor
 Vlasta Burian - Czechoslovak actor

See also 
 Slavic names

References 
 Miloslava Knappová, Jak se bude vaše dítě jmenovat?

External links 
 http://www.behindthename.com/name/vlastimil

Czech masculine given names
Slavic masculine given names